The 13th Pan American Games were held in Winnipeg, Manitoba, Canada from July 23 to August 8, 1999.

Medals

Gold

Men's Singles: Jorge David Romero

Men's Points Race: Marlon Pérez

Men's Light-Heavyweight (– 85 kg): Álvaro Velasco
Men's Lightweight (– 69 kg): Jonny González

Silver

10,000 metres: Stella Castro 
Marathon: Iglandini González

Women's Team: Paola Gómez, María Salazar, Clara Guerrero, and Sara Vargas

Men's Keirin: Jhon González 
Women's 3.000m Individual Pursuit: María Luisa Calle

Men's Parallel Bars: Jorge Giraldo

Men's Kumite (– 65 kg): Alberto Espejo

Men's Flyweight (– 56 kg): Nelson Castro 
Men's Featherweight (– 62 kg): Roger Berrio 
Men's Lightweight (– 69 kg): Heriberto Barbosa 
Women's Flyweight (– 48 kg): Leddy Zuluaga
Women's Lightweight (– 63 kg): María Perea Díaz
Women's Super Heavyweight (+ 75 kg): María Isabel Urrutia

Bronze

200 metres: Felipa Palacios

Men's Middleweight (– 75 kg): José Luis Herrera

Men's 4.000m Individual Pursuit: Marlon Pérez 
Women's 25 km Points Race: María Luisa Calle

Men's Pommel Horse: Jorge Giraldo

Men's Team Competition: Colombia

Men's Jump: Simón Siegert

Women's Featherweight (– 53 kg): Luz Adriana Gallego
Women's Super Heavyweight (+ 75 kg): Carmenza Delgado

Results by event

Gilmar Mayo
Héctor Moreno
María Eugenia Villamizar
Zuleima Araméndiz
Orlando Guerrero
Janeth Lucumí
Iglandini González
Felipa Palacios
Mirtha Brock
Norfalia Carabalí
Norma González
Patricia Rodríguez
Sandra Borrero
Antonio Florián Álvarez

Abraham Jaimes
Javier Hernández Mora
Jorge David Romero
Jaime Andrés Gómez
María Salazar
Paola Gómez
Sara Vargas
Clara Guerrero
Antonio Salazar

Carlos Mesa Baena
Francisco Calderón
José Luis Herrera
José Leonardo Cruz
Wilfrido Valdéz
Mario Miranda

John Ramírez
Jhon García
Víctor Herrera
Juan David Alzate
Luis Felipe Laverde
Marlon Pérez
John Jaime González
María Luisa Calle
Víctor Hugo Peña
Santiago Botero
Iván Parra
Hernán Antolinez
Diego Garavito
Carlos Andrés Trujillo
Flor Marina Delgadillo
Antonio Dieguez

César Parra
Stephanie O'Mara
Tatiana Londoño
Marco Bernal
Germán Camargo
Manuel Torres
Roberto González
Roberto Terán
Pedro Chitiva

Juan Miguel Paz
Mauricio Rivas
Saúl Andrés Vasco
William González
Agapito Nusa

Alexánder Rangel
Jorge Giraldo 
Jesús Augusto Romero
Jairo Ruiz

Javier Jaramillo
José Gerardo Serna

Alberto Espejo
Carlos Ignacio Gómez
José Julián Quinchía
Sandra Upegui
Iván Parra

Erika Rueda
Berenice Moreno
José Fernando Bustamante
Diego Rosero
Mauricio Jaramillo
Willy Augusto Trujillo
Ana María Neira
Pilar Delgado
Edwin Guevara

Adriana Rendón
Amanda Haydee Mondol
Andrés Felipe Torres
Bernardo Tobar
Danilo Caro
María Teresa Rueda
Jorge Jaramillo
Juan Fernando Velázquez
Jairo Reyna
Luis Onelio Argota

Ana María Jailler
Adriana Galego
Ana Patricia Pussey
Ana María Aigneren 
Luz Helena Montes 
María Elena Galeano 
Isabel Bonfante
Zunilda Mendoza
Ana Patricia Buj
Claudia León 
Bertha Sofía Gómez 
Yadelcy Flórez 
Eugenia Liliana 
Beatriz Cudriz 
Claudia Miranda

Alfonso Vargas
Daniel Lombana
Bernardo Samper
Diana Samper
Isabel Botero
María Castro
Martha Luz Vega
Santiago Montoya
Mario Leiva

Alejandro Bermúdez
Fernando Jácome
Isabel Ceballos
María Alejandra Ortiz
Jacqueline Gaona
Erika Piedrahíta
Jessica Baross

Diego Germán Ramírez
Carlos Andrés Alvarado
Paúl Alfonso Díaz
Darío Ferrer

Carolina Bejarano
Eduardo González
Milton Eliécer Castro
Mónica Urrego
Iván Darío Valencia

Maria Morales
Ricardo Cardeño
John Freddy Tibocha
María Virginia Prieto
Vela Sebastián Higuera
Camilo Salcedo
Solmar Bermúdez
Nicolás Deeb
Hernán Salcedo

Omar Zapata
Francisco Sandoval
Andrés Cortés
Carlos López
Jorge Olarte
Álvaro Velasco
Jaime Viáfara
Carlos Riascos
Juan José Parra
Mauricio Giraldo
Harold Ramírez
Diego Escobar
Rodrigo Canaval

Normas Ríos
Libardo Arboleda
Álvaro Zapata
David Alarcón
Joaquín Ortíz
Andrés Madrid
Pablo Jiménez
Jorge González
Camilo Pérez
César Molina
Roberto Quitero
Juan Madrid
Sebastían Hernández
Rafael Cuartas
Holmes Arias
David Rivera 
John Rivera 
Felipe Giraldo 
Héctor Escobar 
Iván Gómez

Christian Siegert
Esteban Siegert
María Luisa Botero
Natalia Hernández
Simón Siegert
Darío Mesa

Heriberto Barbosa 
Luz Adriana Gallego
Álvaro Velasco
Leddy Andrea Zuluaga
Bibiana Muñoz
Juan Carlos Fernández
María Alejandra Perea
María Isabel Urrutia
Roger Berrío Hernández
Johnny González Beltrán
Nelson Castro
José Oliver Ruíz
Karouchokov Gantcho

Luis Fernando Izquierdo
Víctor Capacho
Edison Hurtado Lerma
Luis Cortés
Isidro Cañedo

See also
Colombia at the 2000 Summer Olympics

References
 List of participants

Nations at the 1999 Pan American Games
P
Colombia at the Pan American Games